Tombstone Municipal Airport  is a public-use airport located  south east of the CBD of Tombstone, in Cochise County, Arizona, United States.

Facilities and aircraft 
It has one runway with an asphalt surface:
 6/24 measuring 4,430 x 60 feet (1,350 x 18 m)

For the 12-month period ending April 16, 2008, the airport had 340 general aviation aircraft operations, an average of one per day. At that time there were four aircraft based at this airport: two single-engine and two ultralight.

References

External links 

 

Airports in Cochise County, Arizona